Prize Winners is a 1916 American silent comedy film featuring Oliver Hardy.

Cast
 Oliver Hardy as Babe (as Babe Hardy)
 Kate Price as Lady Kate
 Billy Ruge as Billy

See also
 List of American films of 1916
 Oliver Hardy filmography

External links

1916 films
American silent short films
American black-and-white films
1916 comedy films
1916 short films
Silent American comedy films
American comedy short films
1910s American films